Guns & Gulaabs is an upcoming Indian Hindi-language comedy crime thriller streaming television series on Netflix created and directed by Raj and D.K. Produced under the banner D2R Films in collaboration with Netflix, the series stars Rajkummar Rao, Dulquer Salmaan, Adarsh Gourav, Gulshan Devaiah and TJ Bhanu in lead roles.

Inspired by the "Misfits of the World", the series mixes the nostalgic tales of romance, of the 90s, with crime. The series marks the second collaboration of Raj and D.K. with Netflix, after Cinema Bandi.

Premise 
Set in the 90s world of crime and violence's, it depicts the story of love and innocence blending with a humor of romance.

Cast 

 Dulquer Salmaan
 Rajkummar Rao
 Adarsh Gourav
 Gulshan Devaiah
 Pooja Gor
 Satish Kaushik
 Vipin Sharma
 Shreya Dhanwanthary
 Manuj sharma
 Sanchay Goswami
 TJ Bhanu as Chandralekha

Production

Development 
The series was officially announced in January 2022 by Netflix media press release. The first look poster of lead cast Rajkummar Rao and Dulquer Salmaan was revealed in March 2022.

Filming 
Principal photography commenced in early January 2022 before the official announcement . Makers of the series revealed that it took almost 100 days for the shoot due to the third wave of covid-19 in India. The series was officially wrapped up shooting in April 2022.

Marketing 
Short announcement clip of the series was released by Netflix India YouTube Channel in 31 January 2022.

Release 
The series is scheduled to be released on Netflix in Hindi and dubbed versions in Tamil, Telugu, Malayalam and Kannada .

References

External links 
 

Indian crime television series
Indian thriller television series
Hindi-language Netflix original programming
Indian television series distributed by Netflix
Upcoming Netflix original programming
Upcoming comedy television series
2020s Indian television series